Wisuta Heebkaew (born ) is a retired Thai female volleyball player.

She was part of the Thailand women's national volleyball team at the 1998 FIVB Volleyball Women's World Championship in Japan, and also at the 2002 FIVB Volleyball Women's World Championship.

References

1980 births
Living people
Wisuta Heebkaew
Place of birth missing (living people)
Volleyball players at the 2002 Asian Games
Wisuta Heebkaew
Wisuta Heebkaew
Wisuta Heebkaew